The 1968–69 Spartan League season was the 51st in the history of Spartan League. The league consisted of 18 teams.

League table

The division featured 18 teams, 17 from last season and 1 new team:
 Feltham, from Surrey Senior League

References

1968-69
9